Lasiopetalum rotundifolium is a species of flowering plant in the family Malvaceae and is endemic to the south-west of Western Australia. It is an erect to spreading shrub with hairy young stems, round leaves with a heart-shaped base, and pink and dark red flowers.

Description
The lower surface of the leaf is a lighter shade of green and is densely covered with star-shaped hairs. Flowering occurs from September to December.<ref name="FloraBase">{{FloraBase|name=Lasiopetalum rotundifolium |id=5048}}</ref>

TaxonomyLasiopetalum rotundifolium was first formally described in 1974 by Susan Paust in the journal Nuytsia from specimens collected from near New Norcia by Charles Gardner in 1947. The specific epithet (rotundifolium) means "almost circular leaves".

Distribution and habitat
This lasiopetalum grows in shrubby or heathy woodland near Pingelly and Narrogin but is no longer found near the type location.

Conservation statusLasiopetalum rotundifolium'' is listed as "threatened" by the Western Australian Government Department of Biodiversity, Conservation and Attractions, meaning that it is in danger of extinction.

References

rotundifolium
Malvales of Australia
Rosids of Western Australia
Plants described in 1974